Gephyroctenus is a genus of South American wandering spiders first described by Cândido Firmino de Mello-Leitão in 1936.

Species
 it contains nine species:
Gephyroctenus acre Polotow & Brescovit, 2008 – Brazil
Gephyroctenus atininga Polotow & Brescovit, 2008 – Brazil
Gephyroctenus divisor Polotow & Brescovit, 2008 – Brazil
Gephyroctenus esteio Polotow & Brescovit, 2008 – Brazil
Gephyroctenus juruti Polotow & Brescovit, 2008 – Peru, Brazil
Gephyroctenus mapia Polotow & Brescovit, 2008 – Brazil
Gephyroctenus panguana Polotow & Brescovit, 2008 – Peru
Gephyroctenus philodromoides Mello-Leitão, 1936 (type) – Peru, Brazil
Gephyroctenus portovelho Polotow & Brescovit, 2008 – Brazil

References

Araneomorphae genera
Ctenidae
Spiders of South America
Taxa named by Cândido Firmino de Mello-Leitão